Caulerpa ambigua is a species of seaweed in the Caulerpaceae family found in marine waters of the Pacific Ocean near the southern end of Japan.

Description
The branches are arranged in a divaricate pattern and each branch is loosely closed with oppositely arranged scales called ramenta. It is similar in appearance to Caulerpa okamurai which has a larger spread of distribution.

Taxonomy
Caulerpa ambigua was first formally described by Kintarô Okamura in 1897 as part of the work On the Algae from Ogasawara-jima (Bonin Islands) as published in Botanical Magazine, Tokyo. The specific epithet is taken from the Latin word meaning doubtful or uncertain.

References

ambigua
Species described in 1897